Ian Paul Livingstone (born 4 July 1969, in London) is a British composer for television, films and video games. He jointly won an Ivor Novello Award in 2011 for a video game score for Napoleon: Total War.  He was classically trained from the age of five and has a background as a pop/dance music producer, band member and session musician. He is a graduate of Salford University.

Work

Video games

Television and film
He has composed for television for:
 Big Fat Gypsy Weddings 
 The Great British Sewing Bee
 The Repair Shop
 Francesco's Mediterranean Voyage

Other
He has also produced songs, advertising jingles, movie scores and orchestrations. He also worked with Nokia during 2000 to 2004, creating polyphonic arrangements of monophonic ringtones, including the Nokia tune, as well as creating MIDI karaoke backing tracks for Roland.

References

External links
Ian Livingstone's web-site

1969 births
English television composers
Living people
Video game composers